The Gulfstream III, a business jet produced by Gulfstream Aerospace, is an improved variant of the Grumman Gulfstream II.

Design and development
The Gulfstream III was built at Savannah, Georgia, in the United States and was designed as an improved variant of the Grumman Gulfstream II.  Design studies were performed by Grumman Aerospace Corporation in collaboration with Gulfstream American Corporation.  Design of the Gulfstream III started with an effort to synthesize a completely new wing employing NASA supercritical airfoil sections and winglets. Optimization studies considering weight, drag, fuel volume, cost, and performance indicated that a substantial portion of the new wing benefit could be secured with modifications to the existing wing. As a result, the new wing concept was canceled and work began on design modifications that would retain the Gulfstream II wing box structure and trailing edge surfaces.

Compared to the G-1159 Gulfstream II, the wing has  more span and  winglets added, the leading edge is longer and its contour is modified. The fuselage is  longer aft of the main door, the radome is extended and there is a new curved windshield. The aircraft received its type certificate from the American Federal Aviation Administration on 22 September 1980. A total of 202 Gulfstream IIIs were built, with the last example built in 1986.

In 2013, the FAA modified 14 CFR part 91 rules to prohibit the operation of jets weighing 75,000 pounds or less that are not stage 3 noise compliant after December 31, 2015.  The Gulfstream III is listed explicitly in Federal Register 78 FR 39576.  Any Gulfstream IIIs that have not been modified by installing Stage 3 noise compliant engines or have not had "hushkits" installed for non-compliant engines will not be permitted to fly in the contiguous 48 states after December 31, 2015.  14 CFR §91.883 Special flight authorizations for jet airplanes weighing 75,000 pounds or less – lists special flight authorizations that may be granted for operation after December 31, 2015.

By 2018, prices for a used 1982 Gulfstream III started at $695,000.

Variants

Civil variants

 Model G-1159A Gulfstream III - Two or three-crew executive, corporate transport aircraft, powered by two Rolls-Royce Spey turbofan engines.

Military variants
 C-20A - United States Air Force variant configured for 14 passengers and five crew; phased out of USAF service in 2002, one example transferred to NASA for use at the Neil A. Armstrong Flight Research Center at Edwards Air Force Base as a test aircraft.
 C-20B - United States Air Force and United States Coast Guard variant with upgraded electronics, used for Special Air Missions (SAM); the single Coast Guard C-20B was used by the Commandant of the Coast Guard and other senior USCG officials as well as the Secretary of Homeland Security.
 C-20C - United States Air Force C-20B with upgraded and "hardened" secure communications, often utilized as backup aircraft accompanying the VC-25A aircraft when it is operating as Air Force One
 C-20D - United States Navy Operational Support Airlift (OSA) aircraft with modified communications equipment for use by the Navy, normally in support of high-ranking naval officials
 C-20E - Stretched fuselage/redesigned wing variant for use by the United States Army as an Operational Support Airlift (OSA) aircraft
 Gulfstream III SRA-1 - Special reconnaissance and surveillance version for export.
 Gulfstream III SMA-3 - Export model for Denmark, fitted with a Texas Instruments APS-127 search radar. Three maritime reconnaissance and patrol, fisheries protection, search and rescue, and VIP transport aircraft were built for the Royal Danish Air Force in 1983. No longer in service.

NOTE: United States Army C-20F and C-20J, United States Navy/United States Marine Corps C-20G, and United States Air Force C-20H aircraft are all Gulfstream IV variants

Special mission variants
A NASA Gulfstream C-20A (83-0502 cn 389) has been fitted with a centerline pylon to allow it to carry the Unmanned Aerial Vehicle Synthetic Aperture Radar (UAVSAR) pod.

A NASA Gulfstream III (N992NA cn 309) has also been fitted with a centerline pylon to allow it to carry the Airborne Microwave Observatory of Subcanopy and Subsurface (AirMOSS) pod, a modification of the UAVSAR pod.

The Phoenix Air Group operates two former Royal Danish Air Force SMA-3 aircraft (N173PA cn 313, N163PA cn 249) and a Gulfstream III (N186PA cn 317).  One aircraft provides airborne maritime range surveillance for the Missile Defense Agency (MDA) and other Department of Defense range facilities using a high definition Texas Instruments APS-127 Surface Search Radar system. All three are configured with a large cargo door. In 2008 Phoenix Air developed an Airborne Biomedical Containment System with the CDC. In 2014, the system was deployed during the Ebola virus epidemic in Liberia to fly 12 ebola missions to the United States.

N30LX (cn 438) has been modified by the addition of a ventral canoe and sensor turret as the "Dragon Star" Airborne Multi-Intelligence Laboratory for use by Lockheed Martin. This has been leased by Italy since 2012.

Calspan operates N710CF (cn 448), which has been modified as an airborne test bed.  Modifications include a centerline pylon and a dorsal satcom radome

Two Gulfstream IIIs, K2961 (cn 494) and K2962 (cn 495), equipped with long-range oblique photography cameras mounted in the fuselage, were delivered to the Indian Air Force.

Operators

Military and government operators

Military and government operators of the Gulfstream III and C-20 include:
 
 
 Cameroon Air Force (phased out)
 
 Royal Danish Air Force
 
 
 Ghana Air Force
 
 Indian Air Force
 
 Irish Air Corps - leased aircraft
 
 Italian Air Force  operated two Gulfstream III from 1985 until 2003.
 
 Ivory Coast Air Force
 
 Mexican Air Force - (former operator)
 
 Royal Moroccan Air Force

 
 
 
 
 Ugandan Air Force
 
 United States Air Force
 United States Navy
 United States Army
 United States Coast Guard
 National Aeronautics and Space Administration
 
 Venezuelan Air Force
 
 Air Force of Zimbabwe - No. 3 Squadron (former operator)

Accidents and incidents
 August 3, 1996 - Flew into mountain during final approach to Vagar Airport on Faroe Islands. The Gulfstream III (F-330) from RDAF - Royal Danish Air Force was destroyed killing all nine people on board, including the Danish Chief of Defence Jørgen Garde.
 March 29, 2001 - While trying to land at Aspen-Pitkin County Airport, an Avjet Gulfstream III crashed into a hill, killing all 18 people on board.
 July 4, 2017 - On the outskirts of Margarita Island, a Gulfstream III YV2896 of the Venezuelan Vice-President crashed into the sea with nine people on board. Two bodies were later recovered, with the remaining seven occupants believed to have been killed.

Specifications (Gulfstream III)

See also

References

Notes

Bibliography
 
 Michell, Simon. Jane's Civil and Military Aircraft Upgrades 1994–95. Coulsdon, UK:Jane's Information Group, 1994. .
 Taylor, John W. R. (editor). Jane's All The World's Aircraft 1982–83. London:Jane's Yearbooks, 1982. .

External links
 

Gulfstream aircraft
Twinjets
1980s United States business aircraft
T-tail aircraft
Aircraft first flown in 1979
Low-wing aircraft